Herbert Chaplain Raison (13 November 1889, in Wyke Regis – 29 September 1952, in Doncaster)  was an Anglican priest in the twentieth century.

Raison was educated at St John's College, Oxford and Ely Theological College. He was ordained to Rugby Parish Church in  1913; and priested in 1914. He served a further curacy at St George, Leicester before becoming Chaplain of Malvern College in 1917. He was Vice-Principal and Bursar of Warminster Theological College from 1919 to 1922; and Principal of Queen's College, Birmingham from 1923 to 1934. He was Vicar of St Luke, Paddington from 1934 to 1936 and  then Rector of Rector of St Peter, Doncaster until his death.

References

1889 births
1952 deaths
Alumni of St John's College, Cambridge
Alumni of Ely Theological College
Principals of Queen's College, Birmingham
People from Dorset
20th-century English Anglican priests